PFTC may refer to:

 Primary fallopian tube cancer
 PFTC Sports Center, Las Vegas, Nevada, US; See Jean-Paul Mendy
 Putnam Fiduciary Trust Company; See 2003 mutual fund scandal
 Pacific Film and Television Commission, renamed Screen Queensland; See K-9
 Platform Functional Test Console; See LN-3 Inertial Navigation System